Lapri is a rural locality (a settlement) in Mogotsky Selsoviet of Tyndinsky District, Amur Oblast, Russia. The population was 6 as of 2018. There is 1 street.

Geography 
Lapri is located 75 km north of Tynda (the district's administrative centre) by road. Mogot is the nearest rural locality.

References 

Rural localities in Tyndinsky District